Měls mě vůbec rád is the first album by the pop singer Ewa Farna, released on 6 November 2006. It was very successful in the Czech Republic, gaining platinum status within a year of release, with over 25 thousand copies sold.

The album's first single was "Měls mě vůbec rád", followed by "Zapadlej krám", which both reached the Top 5 on the T-Music chart.

Six songs on the album are cover versions with translated lyrics.

Tracks

Personnel
 Ewa Farna − vocals
 Honza Ponocný − guitar
 Jan Lstibůrek − bass guitar
 Roman Lontadze − drums
 Daniel Hádl − keyboard instruments, programming
 David Solař − keyboard instruments, programming

Ewa Farna albums
2006 debut albums